Mittie Maude Lena Gordon (August 2, 1889–1961) was an American black nationalist who established the Peace Movement of Ethiopia. The organization advocated black emigration to West Africa in response to racial discrimination and white supremacy.

Early life
Gordon was born Mittie Maude Lena Nelson in Webster Parish, Louisiana. Dismayed at the poor educational and job prospects in Louisiana, Gordon's family moved to Hope, Arkansas, when she was a child, where she grew up with her nine siblings. Her father, discovering that the schools were no better for black students in Arkansas, decided to homeschool his children himself. Through her father, she learned about the Pan-Africanist ideas of Bishop Henry McNeal Turner, who advocated that former slaves in America should resettle in Africa, and that American blacks shared a common struggle with people of color from all over the world, both ideas that Gordon continued to espouse through her life.

Career
She relocated from the South to East St. Louis, Illinois, in the mid-1910s to seek better job opportunities. In 1917, she and her family were caught in the East St. Louis riots in which dozens of blacks were killed by white mobs. Her son, John Sullivan, was beaten during the riots and died several months later of his injuries.

Gordon was a delegate to the 1929 UNIA convention in Jamaica.  In Chicago, in December 1932, she founded the Peace Movement of Ethiopia, which advocated for the repatriation of African Americans to Liberia, because it would be cheaper to establish African Americans in West Africa than to provide them with welfare in America. Her Peace Movement sent a petition with over 400,000 signatures to President Roosevelt in 1933. The petition was diverted to the State Department, from there it was diverted to the Division of Western European Affairs, where it stagnated. During this time, she also ran a restaurant on State Street in Chicago's predominantly black South Side until economic pressures from the Depression forced it to close in 1934.

Due to her affiliation with Japanese politicians and Japanese members of the Pacific Movement of the Eastern World as well as the Black Dragon Society in the early 1940s, she was put under surveillance by the Federal Bureau of Investigation. In October 1942, she was arrested for "conspiring with the Japanese", an enemy nation of the United States during World War II, and she spent the majority of the war years in jail.

Gordon was married twice. Her first husband was William Gordon, who she married shortly after moving to Chicago; he died in 1948. Her second husband was Moses Gibson.

Death
Gordon died of heart failure on June 16, 1961.

Gordon's nephew (son of her older brother Clarence Allen Nelson) was the musician John Lewis Nelson. Her grandnephew, John Lewis Nelson's son, was the musician Prince.

References

1889 births
1961 deaths
Activists from Louisiana
African-American history in Chicago
Liberia–United States relations
COINTELPRO targets
Activists for African-American civil rights
Universal Negro Improvement Association and African Communities League members